Ein kleines bisschen Horrorschau ("A little bit of horrorshow") (subtitled: Die Lieder aus Clockwork Orange und andere schmutzige Melodien ["The songs from Clockwork Orange and other dirty melodies"]) is the sixth LP by Die Toten Hosen, released in 1988. This is considered by the band as the best DTH album as of 1988.

The LP is mainly a concept album based on the film A Clockwork Orange by Stanley Kubrick, which in turn is based on the book of the same name by Anthony Burgess, although not all of the songs are about the main theme. The idea of the LP has its origin during a performance of A Clockwork Orange at Theater Bonn where the band acted as supernumeraries and as supporting band. Songs 1, 4, 5, 8, 10, 12 are from the play and these are the ones recorded in Schauspielhaus Bonn, other songs were recorded in Berlin and Cologne.

The songs are linked together by snippets of Beethoven's 9th Symphony (played by a symphony orchestra), whose music plays a prominent role in A Clockwork Orange (especially the 9th symphony). The cover features a famous painting of Beethoven by Joseph Karl Stieler. The word 'Horrorschau' is a play on the Nadsat word 'horrorshow', which comes from the Russian хорошо (khorosho) and means 'good' or 'well'. A couple of Nadsat words are used in songs too.

The song "Hier kommt Alex" appears as a bonus track in the game Guitar Hero III: Legends of Rock. It is also included in the European release of Rock Band, and as a downloadable track on the American version. The song is also available for download in Guitar Hero World Tour.

"Bye, bye Alex" is structurally and musically similar to "Hier kommt Alex".

Track listing
 "Hier kommt Alex" ("Here comes Alex") (Meurer, Frege) – 3:53
 "1000 gute Gründe" ("1000 good reasons") (Breitkopf, Frege) – 3:33
 "Ein Schritt zuviel" ("One step too much") (von Holst, Frege) – 2:22
 "Keine Ahnung" ("No idea") (Frege, Frege) – 2:08
 "Die Farbe Grau" ("The colour grey") (Frege, Frege) – 3:52
 "180 Grad" ("180 degrees") (Meurer, Frege) – 4:33
 "Mehr davon" ("More of it") (von Holst, Frege) – 5:10
 "Zahltag" ("Payday") (Breitkopf, Frege) – 2:42
 "35 Jahre" ("35 years") (Rohde, Frege, von Holst) – 2:15
 "Musterbeispiel" ("Prime example") (Frege, von Holst) – 3:55
 "Testbild" ("Test card", lit. "Test picture") (Frege, Frege) – 3:17
 "Bye, bye Alex" (Rohde, Frege) – 2:58

2007 remastered anniversary edition bonus tracks
<li> "Zum Chef (Später Dank)" (To the boss (Late gratitude)) (von Holst, Frege) – 2:10 (from "Hier kommt Alex")
<li> "Jo singt (Das Wort zum Sonntag)" (Jo sings (The word to Sunday)) (von Holst, Frege) – 0:46 (from "Hier kommt Alex"; "Das Wort zum Sonntag" from Damenwahl)
<li> "Liebeslied" (Love song) (Breitkopf, Frege) – 3:50 (from "Hier kommt Alex")
<li> "Die Farbe Grau" – 3:51 (from the play "A Clockwork Orange" in Schauspielhaus Bonn)
<li> "Zahltag" – 2:43 (from the play "A Clockwork Orange" in Schauspielhaus Bonn)
<li> "Musterbeispiel" – 3:51 (from the play "A Clockwork Orange" in Schauspielhaus Bonn)
<li> "1200 Grad" (Breitkopf, Frege) – 4:35 (Ein kleines bißchen Horrorschau demo)
<li> "Einmal in vier Jahren" (Once in four years) (Breitkopf, Frege) – 4:49 (Kauf MICH! demo)
<li> "Schwarze Sheriffs" (Black sheriffs) (Frege, von Holst) – 3:39 (Kauf MICH! demo)
 "Zigarettenautomat" (Cigarette machine) (Frege, Hanns Christian Müller, Müller, Frege) – 2:04 (Unsterblich demo)

Personnel
 Campino - vocals
 Andreas von Holst - guitar
 Michael Breitkopf - guitar
 Andreas Meurer - bass
 Wolfgang Rohde - drums

Charts

Weekly charts

Year-end charts

Certifications

References

Die Toten Hosen albums
1988 albums
Concept albums
German-language albums